The Kazakhstan men's national tennis team represents Kazakhstan in Davis Cup tennis competition and are governed by the Kazakhstan Tennis Federation. In 2011, Kazakhstan competed in the World Group for the first time after they won against Switzerland in the 2010 World Group Play-offs. After the first round win against the Czech Republic in 2011, Kazakhstan secured their spot in the World Group for the 2012 Davis Cup.  They lost in the first round to Spain, but defeated Uzbekistan in the play-offs, which again kept them in the World Group for 2013.  In 2013, they defeated Austria in the first round, but lost to the Czech Republic in the quarterfinals.

History
Kazakhstan competed in its first Davis Cup in 1995. Kazakh players previously represented the USSR national tennis team.

In 2010, Kazakhstan competed in the Davis Cup Asia/Oceania Zone, beating South Korea in the 1st round, 5 rubbers to 0, and China in the 2nd round, 4 rubbers to 1, to earn a spot in the World Group playoffs. Kazakhstan then beat Switzerland, 5 rubbers to 0, to earn a spot in the 2011 World Group. Kazakhstan competed in the World Group in at least the following 4 years.

In 2021, Kazakhstan are in the quarterfinals, after winning their Round-robin tournament group stage.

Group B

Current team (2022) 

 Alexander Bublik
 Mikhail Kukushkin
 Dmitry Popko
 Aleksandr Nedovyesov
 Andrey Golubev (Doubles player)

External links

Davis Cup teams
Tennis
Davis Cup